Das Jagdgewehr (The Hunting Gun) is a German-language opera in three acts by Thomas Larcher to a libretto by  after the 1949 short novel Ryōjū (猟銃, The Hunting Gun) by Yasushi Inoue. It received its premiere at the Bregenzer Festspiele on 15 August 2018. The UK premiere was at Snape Maltings, Aldeburgh, June 2019.

Cast
The Poet, who sees the hunter in the snow (tenor)
Josuke Misugi, the hunter in the snow (baritone)
Midori, the hunter's wife who asks him for a divorce, (soprano)
Saiko, his secret lover, who is also Midori's cousin and best friend (mezzo-soprano)
Shoko, Josuke and Saiko's daughter (soprano)

Recordings
Larcher: Das Jagdgewehr: Sarah Aristidou (Shoko), Giulia Peri (Midori), Olivia Vermeulen (Saiko), Robin Tritschler (The Poet),  (Josuke Misugi), Ensemble Modern, Michael Boder 2020, C Major

References

2018 operas
German-language operas
Operas based on novels
Operas